Trish Van Devere (born Patricia Louise Dressel; March 9, 1941) is a retired American actress. She was nominated for a Golden Globe Award for the film One Is a Lonely Number (1972), and won a Genie Award for the film The Changeling (1980). She is the widow of actor George C. Scott, with whom she appeared in multiple films.

Early life
Van Devere was born March 9, 1941 as Patricia Louise Dressel in Tenafly, New Jersey. Her father owned a Pontiac dealership and real estate business, which was inherited by her mother after her father's death when Van Devere was 9 years old. After attending Tenafly High School, she graduated in 1958 from Northern Valley High School before attending Ohio Wesleyan University, where she met and married fellow student Grant Van Devere. The marriage lasted only 8 months, though she retained Van Devere as her stage name.

Career
In 1966, Van Devere moved to New York City and began pursuing a career in acting, studying at the Actors Studio. She co-founded the Free Southern Theater with Scott Cunningham, an African American fellow actor, staging plays in fields and at churches in the Southern United States for indigent African Americans who had never seen live theater before. Two years later, Van Devere and Cunningham founded an offshoot theater company, the Poor People's Theater in New York City, headquartered in the basement of Manhattan's Riverside Church, which held similar theatrical productions in churches, schools, and streets.

Van Devere had her breakthrough portraying the original Meredith Lord in the soap opera One Life to Live in 1968 — the income from which she largely used to help maintain the Poor People's Theater Company. In 1970, she co-starred with George Segal and Ruth Gordon in the comedy Where's Poppa?. She subsequently garnered significant notice for her lead role in the film One Is a Lonely Number (1972), for which she was nominated for a Golden Globe award.

Van Devere married actor George C. Scott in September 1972 in Santa Monica, California, after they appeared together in the film The Last Run (1971). The couple subsequently appeared in a number of films together, including The Day of the Dolphin, and The Savage Is Loose (both 1973, the latter film directed by Scott); the television film Beauty and the Beast (1976), Movie Movie (1978), and the supernatural horror film The Changeling (1980). Also in 1980, Van Devere had a lead role in the horror film The Hearse.

Van Devere performed frequently in both television and film until 1994, and appeared in television programs such as Love Story, The Fall Guy, Hardcastle and McCormick, Highway to Heaven and Love Boat. She also starred alongside Peter Falk in a 1978 episode of the detective series Columbo entitled Make Me a Perfect Murder, in which she portrayed a TV producer who murders her ex-lover. She remained married to Scott until his death in 1999.

Filmography

Awards and nominations

Notes

References

External links

1941 births
Living people
Actresses from New Jersey
American film actresses
American soap opera actresses
American television actresses
Best Performance by a Foreign Actress Genie Award winners
Northern Valley Regional High School at Demarest alumni
Ohio Wesleyan University alumni
People from Englewood Cliffs, New Jersey
People from Tenafly, New Jersey
Tenafly High School alumni
20th-century American actresses
21st-century American women